Giuseppe Farfanelli (13 February 1915 – 8 January 1992) was an Italian boxer who competed in the 1936 Summer Olympics. He was born in Perugia. In 1936 he was eliminated in the first round of the featherweight class after losing his fight to John Treadaway.

References

Report on Italian Olympic boxers
Giuseppe Farfanelli's profile at Sport & Note

1915 births
1992 deaths
Sportspeople from Perugia
Featherweight boxers
Olympic boxers of Italy
Boxers at the 1936 Summer Olympics
Italian male boxers
20th-century Italian people